Crompton Hill is an unincorporated community in Clinton Township, Vermillion County, in the U.S. state of Indiana.

Geography
Indiana State Road 163 (Hazel Bluff Road) runs east-and-west through the town.

References

Unincorporated communities in Vermillion County, Indiana
Unincorporated communities in Indiana